The 2016 Ligue 1 is the 49th season of Ligue 1, the top professional league for association football clubs in the Republic of the Congo, since its establishment in 1961.

The league was abandoned in both 2014 and 2015, due to financial problems and club boycotts, respectively. AC Léopards is the defending champion from the 2013 season.

Clubs

A total of 20 teams will contest the league after expanding from 18 teams with the promotion of Jeunes Fauves and Kimbonguila Kinkala from Ligue 2. Pigeon Vert was also promoted to Ligue 1 when FC Bilombé withdrew from the league.

Table

References 

2016 in the Republic of the Congo sport
Football competitions in the Republic of the Congo